UltraESB is a lightweight enterprise service bus (ESB) capable of supporting many transports and message formats natively. It allows messages to be mediated via Java or JSR 223 scripting languages through an API, and is the first ESB to claim support for Zero-Copy proxying of messages with Non-Blocking IO capabilities. In 2013, it was selected as the ESB and API Management platform by a recent Fortune #1 company based on its performance and stability.

The initial version was published in January 2010  and the code was subsequently open sourced under the OSI approved Affero General Public License (AGPL) in 24 August 2010. Continuous nightly builds are there to ensure the performance of latest development code.

Features
Some of the key features of UltraESB are:
 Use any IDE – Allowing users to choose any IDE for development significantly reduces the learning curve for development
 Ability to unit test, along with close to 50% code coverage
 Easily extensible via third-party libraries, Spring configured beans and custom code
 Support for number of message formats and transformations
 Support for payloads and protocols such as AS2, HL7, SOAP, REST, FIX transports such as MLLP/S, JMS, AMQP, FTP/S, SFTP and WS-Security, XACML and JTA XA transactions
 Very light weight download of ~42MB for complete distribution (Minimal version < 9MB)
 Support for clustering and fail-over for high-availability
 Built-in metrics and JMX, CLI and Web based management

Supporting tools

Design and development tools
UltraESB is equipped with various development tools for testing, development and deployment.
 IntelliJ IDEA, Eclipse and NetBeans as IDEs
 Plugin for IntelliJ IDEA
 UTerm – An interactive command line and scriptable administration utility
 JMX based management/monitoring support and integration with the Zabbix open source monitoring solution

Management and monitoring tools
The management and monitoring tools are shipped with all distributions other than the minimal (Complete distribution & Source distribution).
 UConsole – The web based management and monitoring console
 IMonitor – executes as an independent web application and allows managing and monitoring either a single node or a cluster of ESBs

See also
 Apache ServiceMix, a similar and related open-source ESB
 Guaraná DSL
 FUSE ESB
 Oracle Enterprise Service Bus
 Open ESB

References

External links
 Company website
 Source code

Enterprise application integration
Service-oriented (business computing)
Message-oriented middleware
Software using the GNU AGPL license